Shivam Dube (born 26 June 1993) is an Indian cricketer who plays for Mumbai in domestic cricket and the Chennai Super Kings in the Indian Premier League (IPL). He is an all-rounder who bats left-handed and bowls right-arm at medium pace. He made his international debut for the India cricket team in November 2019.

Early life
Shivam Dube was born on 26 June 1993 in Mumbai, India. He stopped playing cricket at the age of 14 as he was overweight and unable to work on his fitness due to financial constraints. He returned to play at the age of 19 and was soon selected for the Mumbai Under-23s.

Domestic career
He made his Twenty20 debut for Mumbai in the 2015–16 Syed Mushtaq Ali Trophy on 18 January 2016. He made his List A debut for Mumbai in the 2016–17 Vijay Hazare Trophy on 25 February 2017.

He made his first-class debut for Mumbai in the 2017–18 Ranji Trophy on 7 December 2017. In the first innings, he took his maiden five-wicket haul in first-class cricket. On 2 November 2018, in Mumbai's match against Railways in the 2018–19 Ranji Trophy, he scored his maiden century in first-class cricket. In his next match, against Karnataka, he took another five-wicket haul, with seven wickets for 54 runs. On 17 December 2018, in the Ranji Trophy match against Baroda, Dube hit five sixes in one over. It was the second time he had scored five sixes in an over, after doing it against Pravin Tambe in the Mumbai T20 League in March, where he was also named the player of the tournament. He was the leading wicket-taker for Mumbai in the Ranji Trophy in 2018, with 23 dismissals in eight matches.

In December 2018, he was bought by the Royal Challengers Bangalore in the player auction for the 2019 Indian Premier League. In February 2021, Dube was bought by the Rajasthan Royals in the IPL auction ahead of the 2021 Indian Premier League. In February 2022, he was bought by the Chennai Super Kings in the auction for the 2022 Indian Premier League tournament.

International career
In October 2019, Dube was named in India's Twenty20 International (T20I) squad for their series against Bangladesh. He made his T20I debut for India, against Bangladesh, on 3 November 2019. Later the same month, Dube was named in India's One Day International (ODI) squad for their series against the West Indies. He made his ODI debut for India, against the West Indies, on 15 December 2019. On 2 February 2020, in the fifth T20I match against New Zealand, Dube bowled the second-most expensive over in a T20I match, conceding 34 runs.

Personal life
On 16 July 2021, Dube married Anjum Khan in Mumbai. The wedding was performed using both Hindu and Islamic rituals. The couple had their first child, who was a boy, on 13 February 2022.

References

External links
 

1993 births
Living people
Indian cricketers
India One Day International cricketers
India Twenty20 International cricketers
Mumbai cricketers
Cricketers from Mumbai
Rajasthan Royals cricketers
Royal Challengers Bangalore cricketers
Chennai Super Kings cricketers